American Journal of Ophthalmology is a monthly peer-reviewed medical journal covering ophthalmology. It was established in 1884 and is published by Elsevier. The editor-in-chief is Richard K. Parrish II (Bascom Palmer Eye Institute).

Indexing and abstracting
The journal is indexed and abstracted in the following databases:

See also
British Journal of Ophthalmology
Ophthalmology

References

External links
 

Ophthalmology journals
Elsevier academic journals
English-language journals
Publications established in 1884
Monthly journals